This is a list of Members of Parliament (MPs) elected to the Grand National Assembly for the 25th Parliament of the Republic of Turkey at the June 2015 general election, which was held on 7 June 2015.

Electoral districts are ordered in alphabetical order, and parties within the electoral districts are ordered according their ranking within that district. Within the parties, MPs are ordered according to their orders in the party lists.

The list shows the parties from which they were elected, not subsequent changes. It also does not show the vacated seats.

Adana

Adıyaman

Afyonkarahisar

Ağrı

Aksaray

Amasya

Ankara

1st electoral district

2nd electoral district

Antalya

Ardahan

Artvin

Aydın

Balıkesir

Bartın

Batman

Bayburt

Bilecik

Bingöl

Bitlis

Bolu

Burdur

Bursa

Çanakkale

Çankırı

Çorum

Denizli

Diyarbakır

Düzce

Edirne

Elazığ

Erzincan

Erzurum

Eskişehir

Gaziantep

Giresun

Gümüşhane

Hakkari

Hatay

Iğdır

Isparta

İstanbul

1st electoral district

2nd electoral district

3rd electoral district

İzmir

1st electoral district

2nd electoral district

Kahramanmaraş

Karabük

Karaman

Kars

Kastamonu

Kayseri

Kırıkkale

Kırklareli

Kırşehir

Kilis

Kocaeli

Konya

Kütahya

Malatya

Manisa

Mardin

Mersin

Muğla

Muş

Nevşehir

Niğde

Ordu

Osmaniye

Rize

Sakarya

Samsun

Siirt

Sinop

Sivas

Şanlıurfa

Şırnak

Tekirdağ

Tokat

Trabzon

Tunceli

Uşak

Van

Yalova

Yozgat

Zonguldak

References

Terms of the Grand National Assembly of Turkey
June 2015 Turkish general election

2015 in Turkish politics
Political history of Turkey